Hézecques is a commune in the Pas-de-Calais department in the Hauts-de-France region of France.

Geography
A small village situated some 20 miles (32 km) northeast of Montreuil-sur-Mer on the D133E1 road.

It is surrounded by the communes Lugy, Beaumetz-lès-Aire and Matringhem. Hézecques is located 25 km southwest of Saint-Omer, the nearest city.

Population

Places of interest
 The church of St.Peter, dating from the sixteenth century.

See also
Communes of the Pas-de-Calais department

References

Communes of Pas-de-Calais